The Cabinet Secretary for Social Justice, Housing and Local Government, commonly referred to as the Social Justice Secretary, is a position in the Scottish Government Cabinet. The Cabinet Secretary has overall responsibility for local government, community planning, housing, social security, the third sector.

The Cabinet Secretary is assisted by two junior Ministers, the Minister for Equalities and Older People and the Minister for Social Security and Local Government.

The current Cabinet Secretary is Shona Robison, who was appointed in May 2021.

History 
From 2007 to 2009 the Minister for Communities and Sport was a junior ministerial post in the Scottish Government. In 2009, sport was linked with public health and the role became the Minister for Housing and Communities.

Following the 2011 election, the role was reorganised as Minister for Housing and Welfare but as a junior ministerial position, the Minister did not attend the Scottish Cabinet.

A cabinet post was created in April 2014 as a result of Alex Salmond's gender-balancing cabinet reshuffle. The post was Cabinet Secretary for Commonwealth Games, Sport, Equalities and Pensioners' Rights with Shona Robison at the helm. This was short-lived, however, as the job was further restyled as Cabinet Secretary for Social Justice, Communities and Pensioners' Rights as a result of Nicola Sturgeon's first reshuffle after she became First Minister in November 2014, with Alex Neil being given the role.

This was further rebranded in May 2016 as Cabinet Secretary for Communities, Social Security and Equalities in the second Sturgeon government, and took on its current name at the start of the third Sturgeon government. Between 2018 and 2021 responsibility for social security was held by a separate cabinet-level post, the Cabinet Secretary for Social Security and Older People.

Overview

Responsibilities
The responsibilities of the Cabinet Secretary for Social Justice, Housing and Local Government include:

 welfare policy and social security
 social justice
 local government
 child poverty
 housing and housing strategy
 homelessness and rough sleeping
 building standards
 tackling inequalities
 violence against women and girls and domestic violence
 poverty action measures
 third sector and social economy
 mainstreaming equality
 human rights
 kinship carers
 minimum income guarantee
 equalities
 refugees and asylum
 Office of the Scottish Charity Regulator

Public bodies
The following public bodies report to the Cabinet Secretary for Social Justice, Housing and Local Government:
 Boundaries Scotland
 Scottish Housing Regulator
 Social Security Scotland

List of office holders

References

External links 
 Cabinet Secretary for Communities and Local Government on the Scottish Government website

Scottish Parliament
Communities and Local Government